Amastra spirizona is a species of land snail, a terrestrial pulmonate gastropod mollusk in the Amastridae family. 

Subspecies
 Amastra spirizona chlorotica (L. Pfeiffer, 1856) 
 Amastra spirizona nigrolabris E.A. Smith, 1873
 Amastra spirizona rudis L. Pfeiffer, 1855

Description
The length of the shell attains 18 mm.

Distribution
This species is endemic to Hawaii.

References

Molluscs of Hawaii
Amastra
Gastropods described in 1825
Taxonomy articles created by Polbot